Ninja miner is a nickname for a person who digs small unauthorized mines or pans dirt for gold in Mongolia. The miners are so named because the green bowls they use for panning, when carried on their backs, are said to resemble the shells of the Teenage Mutant Ninja Turtles.

Many ninja miners are Mongolians who lost their jobs after the fall of the People's Republic of Mongolia and became traditional herders. In 2001 and 2002 Mongolia faced two harsh winters (known as dzuds), and a third of the country's livestock was lost. Thousands of families took up ninja mining, and searched for quartz or gold on properties large mining companies deemed unmineable. Holes that are near to each other are connected underground. Upon completion of the hole one ninja miner works at the bottom of the hole by candlelight, digging up dirt, while another pulls dirt to the surface to be sifted by yet another ninja miner.

In 2003 there were approximately 30,000 ninja miners in Mongolia, which increased to 100,000 in 2007. Ninja miners earned an average of $10 a week in 2003, which increased to $5–10 per day in 2007. Students on summer break often work with their parents to help pay tuition. The largest ninja mining area is at Zaamar, a five-hour drive from Ulan Bator.

Ninja Mining is having an adverse effect on agriculture, as nomadic herders are having to move more frequently to find land for their livestock to graze on due to the increase in holes and the reduced amount of grass. This combined with the northward expansion of the Gobi Desert is causing some herders to reduce their herd to focus on higher quality livestock, while others are giving up nomadism and moving setting up farms and cooperatives. Peter Morrow, the CEO of Khan Bank (the former state agricultural bank) said this could be the end of traditional herding in Mongolia, "the last horse-based nomadic culture in the world".

An episode of the Animal Planet series River Monsters filmed in Mongolia mentioned ninja miners; a local guide mentioning that ninjas will aggressively defend their claims from intruders.

A feature-documentary Price of Gold  (Sven Zellner, Chingunjav Borkhuu; D 2012) ARTE - Dokumentarfilmpreis Duisburger Filmwoche  - HotDocs Toronto 2012, official selection World Showcase.

A photo-essay "Ninjas" by Sven Zellner and Building Sand Castles on the Steppe? Mining, Herding and Water Governance in the Gobi by  Jennifer Lander and photographer Sven Zellner

See also
 Artisanal mining
 Bootleg mining
Illegal mining

References 

Mining in Mongolia
Surface mining
Traditional mining
Illegal mining